This is a list of all personnel changes for the 2017 EuroLeague off-season and 2017–18 EuroLeague season (until 28 February 2018).

Retirements
The following players who played in the 2016–17 Euroleague, and played more than three EuroLeague seasons, retired.

Managerial changes

Player movements

Between two EuroLeague teams

To a EuroLeague team

Leaving a EuroLeague team

References

External links
EuroLeague roster moves
EuroCup roster moves

Transactions
EuroLeague transactions